Associated Production Music, LLC (commonly known as APM Music) is an American production music company headquartered in Hollywood, California, initially as a joint venture between Zomba/Jive Production Music and EMI Production Music. APM Music's catalog contains more than 1,000,000 tracks and its libraries include KPM Music, Bruton, Sonoton, Cezame, Hard and Kosinus, among others. Music tracks from APM Music are used in TV shows, including SpongeBob SquarePants, The Ren & Stimpy Show, The Mighty B!, GLOW, This is Us, and Westworld; films, including Lady Bird, Mudbound, and The Disaster Artist; and video games, including Skylanders: Imaginators, Call of Duty: Infinite Warfare, and Tom Clancy's Ghost Recon Wildlands. They were also used in various Motorola phones as ringtones. NFL Films has a joint venture between the NFL and APM Music where music is composed for NFL-related media. The APM catalog includes recordings dating back to 1900, music representing 192 countries, and well-known tracks like "Heavy Action" (the theme for Monday Night Football), "The Big One" (the theme for The People's Court), and "Sweet Victory" (from the SpongeBob SquarePants episode "Band Geeks").

History 
APM Music came to be as a joint venture between Zomba/Jive Production Music and EMI Production Music (which now are owned by Universal and Sony, respectively). Sam Trust, former head of ATV, founded APM as a joint-venture between what is now held by Universal (which owns the Kosinus and Bruton library) and Sony (which owns KPM).

The company was primarily set up to distribute third-party music libraries and its core business revolves around curation and guiding, where most of the music is specifically conditioned to fill a market need. Instrumental to such curation is a dedicated team of expert Music Directors with whom clients consistently partner for creative collaboration.

Notable composers 
Some notable composers who have worked with APM Music include:

See also 
 Trailer music
 EMI Production Music

References

External links 
 

Music companies of the United States
Joint ventures
EMI
Universal Music Group
Sony Music Publishing
Production music